Elina Svitolina was the defending champion but withdrew before her second round match.

Ashleigh Barty won her first WTA title, defeating Nao Hibino in the final, 6–3, 6–2.

Seeds

Draw

Finals

Top half

Bottom half

Qualifying

Seeds

Qualifiers

Draw

First qualifier

Second qualifier

Third qualifier

Fourth qualifier

Fifth qualifier

Sixth qualifier

References
Main Draw
Qualifying Draw

Malaysian Open
Malaysian Open (tennis)